The 2018 Quaker State 400 presented by Walmart is a Monster Energy NASCAR Cup Series race held on July 14, 2018 at Kentucky Speedway in Sparta, Kentucky. Contested over 267 laps on the  speedway, it was the 19th race of the 2018 Monster Energy NASCAR Cup Series season.

Report

Background

The sixth running of the Quaker State 400 was held in Sparta, Kentucky at Kentucky Speedway on July 9, 2016. The track is a  tri-oval speedway owned by Speedway Motorsports, Inc. Kentucky Speedway, which has also hosted the ARCA Racing Series, NASCAR Camping World Truck Series, NASCAR Xfinity Series, and the Indy Racing League, has a grandstand seating capacity of 107,000.

Entry list

Practice

First practice

Final practice

Qualifying

Qualifying results

Race

Stage Results

Stage 1
Laps: 80

Stage 2
Laps: 80

Final Stage Results

Stage 3
Laps: 107

Race statistics
 Lead changes: 7 among different drivers
 Cautions/Laps: 4 for 22
 Red flags: 0
 Time of race: 2 hours, 39 minutes and 43 seconds
 Average speed:

Media

Television
NBC Sports covered the race on the television side. Rick Allen, Jeff Burton, Steve Letarte and Dale Earnhardt Jr. had the call in the booth for the race. Dave Burns, Parker Kligerman, Marty Snider and Kelli Stavast reported from pit lane during the race.

Radio
PRN had the radio call for the race, which was simulcast on Sirius XM NASCAR Radio.

Standings after the race

Drivers' Championship standings

Manufacturers' Championship standings

Note: Only the first 16 positions are included for the driver standings.
. – Driver has clinched a position in the Monster Energy NASCAR Cup Series playoffs.

References

2018 Quaker State 400
2018 Monster Energy NASCAR Cup Series
2018 in sports in Kentucky
July 2018 sports events in the United States